Urine electrolyte levels can be measured in a medical laboratory for diagnostic purposes. The urine concentrations of sodium, chloride and potassium may be used to investigate conditions such as abnormal blood electrolyte levels, acute kidney injury, metabolic alkalosis and hypovolemia. Other electrolytes that can be measured in urine are calcium, phosphorus and magnesium.

References

Urine tests